Veľký Lipník is a former Lemko village and municipality in Stará Ľubovňa District in the Prešov Region of northern Slovakia. The village is traditionally inhabited by Rusyny/Ruthenians , as one of their westernmost settlements. There is Greek Catholic church built in 1794.

History
In historical records the village was first mentioned in 1338. In the 15th or 16th century Vlachs settled here, and Slavs  Local Rusyns had prior to World War I many relationships with Lemkos from Ruś Szlachtowska.

Geography
The municipality lies at an altitude of 580 metres and covers an area of 27.513 km². It has a population of about 1010 people.

References

External links
https://web.archive.org/web/20070513023228/http://www.statistics.sk/mosmis/eng/run.html

Villages and municipalities in Stará Ľubovňa District